The University of Nîmes (Université de Nîmes), also known as Unîmes, is a French university, in the Academy of Montpellier. It was founded on 7 May 2007 as the successor to the Nîmes University Center for Training and Research (Centre Universitaire de Formation et de Recherche de Nîmes), which already bore the short name Unîmes.

The University of Nîmes offers undergraduate and graduate programs across four faculties: Faculty of Law, Economics, Management; Faculty of Arts, Letters, Languages; Faculty of Science and Technology; and Faculty of Social Sciences.

The university offers courses in English, Spanish, and German, and it welcomes students from all backgrounds and nationalities.

See also 
 List of early modern universities in Europe
 List of public universities in France by academy

Educational institutions established in 2007
2007 establishments in France
Universities and colleges in Nîmes
Universities in Occitania (administrative region)